The Maio Island League is a regional championship played in Maio Island, Cape Verde. The competition is organized by the Maio Regional Football Association (Associação Regional do Maio de Futebol, ARMF). The winner of the championship plays in Cape Verdean football Championships of each season. Since 2015, the last place club relegates and Beira-Mar was the first club to be relegated.

About the Island/Regional League
The competition was founded around 1990 and was the last inhabited island without its own regional championships. They started out with six clubs, later it was increased to seven clubs which was the tenth most in the nation.  From 2011 to 2015, it was shared with Brava having the second fewest clubs in Cape Verde which was also the ninth most.

For several seasons, the league featured seven clubs and played for a total of 12 rounds.  Between the early 2010s up to 2015, the club was short of two clubs and featured only five clubs and played for a total of 10 rounds with a bye week.

In 2015, the Maio Premier Division replaced the Maio Island (or Regional) Championships and the island's Second Division was established.

In the following season, the division may contain eight clubs as the last place club heads to play a division decisional match with the second placed club.

Title history
Académico 83 was the first club to win an island title, followed by Onze Unidos, Beira-Mar won their first in 1997, Académico 83 won another in 1998, Onze Unidos won six straight titles between 1999 and 2005 with the 2000 season not held.  Two recent clubs won their first title, Barreirense in 2006 and Académica do Maio or Calheta in 2007, Académica do Maio from Calheta won two straight titles in 2008.  Onze Unidos won in 2008 followed by Barreirense's second and recent title win, Onze Unidos again won a title for 2011, Académico won two straight in 2013, Académica da Calheta won their recent title in 2014.  Académico 83 won another two straight titles, including their recent win of the 2015/16 season.

Maio Premier Division Clubs 2017/18
 Académica do Maio - Vila da Calheta
 Académico 83 - Cidade do Porto Inglês
 Barreirense - Vila do Barreiro
 Miramar - Ribeira Dom João
 Morrerense - Morro
 CD Onze Unidos - Cidade do Porto Inglês
 Real Marítimo - Cascabulho (also known as Marítimo de Cascabulho)
 Santana de Morrinho - Morrinho

Winners

Maio Island League

1990/91 : Académico 83
1991/92 : Onze Unidos
1992/93 : Académico 83
1993/94 : Académico 83
1994/95 : Onze Unidos
1995/96 : Onze Unidos
1996/97 : Beira Mar
1997/98 : Académico 83
1998/99 : Onze Unidos
1999/2000 : Not held
2000/01 : Onze Unidos
2001/02 : Onze Unidos
2002/03 : Onze Unidos
2003/04 : Onze Unidos
2004/05 : Onze Unidos
2005/06 : Barreirense
2006/07 : Académica do Maio
2007/08 : Académica do Maio
2008/09 : Onze Unidos
2009/10 : Barreirense
2010/11 : Onze Unidos
2011/12 : Académico 83
2012/13 : Académico 83
2013/14 : Académica do Maio
2014/15 : Académico 83

Maio Premier Division
2015/16: Académico 83
2016/17: Onze Unidos
2017/18: Barreirense FC
2018/19: Académico 83

Performance By Club

Performance by area

Youth Championships (under 17)
2012-13: Académico 83
2013-14: Académico 83
2014-15: Académico 83

See also
Maio Island Cup
Maio Super Cup
Maio Opening Tournament
Maio Champion's Cup

References

External links
Maio Island League 

 
Second level football leagues in Cape Verde
1990 establishments in Cape Verde
Sports leagues established in 1990